The Annales médico-psychologiques is a peer-reviewed medical journal covering the field of psychiatry. It was established in 1843 and is published by Elsevier on behalf of the Société médico-psychologique. Articles are published in French with abstracts in English. The editor-in-chief is Aimé Charles Nicolas (Centre Hospitalier Universitaire de Martinique).

Abstracting and indexing
The journal is abstracted and indexed in:

According to the Journal Citation Reports, the journal has a 2017 impact factor of 0.222.

References

Further reading

External links

Publications established in 1843
Psychiatry journals
Elsevier academic journals
French-language journals
1843 establishments in France